Enteromius prionacanthus is a species of ray-finned fish in the genus Enteromius which is endemic to Gabon.

References

 

Endemic fauna of Gabon
Enteromius
Taxa named by Jacques Géry 
Fish described in 1982